Neural Designer is a software tool for machine learning based on neural networks, a main area of artificial intelligence research, and contains a graphical user interface which simplifies data entry and interpretation of results.

In 2015, Neural Designer was chosen by the European Commission, within the Horizon 2020 program, as a disruptive technology in the ICT field.

Features

Neural Designer performs descriptive, diagnostic, predictive and prescriptive data analytics. It implements deep architectures with multiple non-linear layers and contains utilities to solve function regression, pattern recognition, time series and autoencoding problems.

The input to Neural Designer is a data set, and its output is a predictive model. That result takes the form of an explicit mathematical expression, which can be exported to any computer language or system.

Related tools

Weka: free machine learning and data mining software.
RapidMiner: free and commercial machine learning framework implemented in Java.
KNIME: free and commercial machine learning and data mining software.

See also

Artificial intelligence
Artificial neural network
Comparison of deep learning software
Data mining
Deep learning
Machine learning
Predictive analytics

References

C++ software
Deep learning software
Proprietary software that uses Qt